Lake Veluyoc Cocha (possibly from Quechua  dry maize reed, -yuq a suffix to indicate ownership, qucha lake,) is a lake in the Andes of Peru. It is situated in the Puno Region, Carabaya Province, Crucero District. It lies southwest of the mountain Veluyoc Orjo and west of the mountain Aricoma and Lake Aricoma.

References

Lakes of Peru
Lakes of Puno Region